The Trade Union Confederation 90 of Slovenia (KS 90) is a trade union confederation of Slovenia. It was formed in February 1991 and is based in the south-west area of the country.

References

External links
 KS 90 official site.

Trade unions in Slovenia
Trade unions established in 1990